Ganeshram Khatik was an Indian politician and member of the Legislative Assembly. He belonged to Bharatiya Janata Party and represented Pathariya Assembly Constituency from 1998 to 2003.

References

Living people
Bharatiya Janata Party politicians from Madhya Pradesh
People from Damoh district
Madhya Pradesh MLAs 1998–2003
Year of birth missing (living people)